ITI Arab Ki Sarai, is a vocational education institute in New Delhi, India. It lies on an eight-acre site adjacent to Humayun's Tomb in Nizamuddin East. It offers one- and two-year full-time courses of relevance to 28 different trades and is affiliated to the National Council for Vocational Training and also the State Council for Vocational Training.

History
The institute was originally started by the Government of India, Ministry of Rehabilitation as Vocational Training Center for displaced persons in 1948.  Its  name was subsequently changed to "Training – cum- Work Center" in 1949. The centre was transferred to the charge of the Directorate General of Employment & Training, Ministry of Labour & Employment on 22 May 1958 and re–named as an Industrial Training Institute.

References 

Education in Delhi